Denis Florentin Ispas (born 5 September 1993) is a Romanian professional footballer who plays as a defender for Liga I club Universitatea Cluj. In his career, Ispas also played for teams such as Chindia Târgoviște, Dunărea Călărași or FC U Craiova, among others.

Honours
Chindia Târgoviște
Liga III: 2014–15
ACS Șirineasa
Liga III: 2017–18
FC U Craiova
Liga II: 2020–21

References

External links
 

1993 births
Living people
Sportspeople from Târgoviște
Romanian footballers
Association football defenders
Liga I players
FC Dunărea Călărași players
Liga II players
AFC Chindia Târgoviște players
ACS Viitorul Târgu Jiu players
FCV Farul Constanța players
AFC Turris-Oltul Turnu Măgurele players
FC U Craiova 1948 players
FC Universitatea Cluj players